Lamprohaminoea cymbalum, sometimes known as the Cymbal bubble snail, is a species of sea snail or bubble snail, a marine opisthobranch gastropod mollusc in the family Haminoeidae, one of the families of bubble snails.

Distribution
Lamprohaminoea cymbalum  is found in the Indo-West Pacific oceans from Hawaii and Christmas Island. It is not a common species, but locally large populations can be found.

Description
The soft tissues of L. cymbalum are lime green with orange and purple markings. As with all Haminoeidae, it is herbivorous and feeds on algae. It secretes a metabolite which has deterrent properties towards carnivorous fish.

References

Haminoeidae
Gastropods described in 1850